The fourth and final season of the fantasy comedy television series The Good Place, created by Michael Schur, was ordered by NBC on December 4, 2018. The season premiered on September 26, 2019, and consisted of 14 episodes.
The season is produced by Fremulon, 3 Arts Entertainment, and Universal Television.

The series focuses on Eleanor Shellstrop (Kristen Bell), a deceased young woman who wakes up in the afterlife and is welcomed by Michael (Ted Danson) to "the Good Place" in reward for her righteous life; however, she eventually discovers that Michael's "Good Place" is a hoax, and she is actually in the "Bad Place", to be psychologically and emotionally tortured by her fellow afterlife residents. Eleanor and Michael claim that "the points system" for assigning humans to the Good Place or Bad Place is fundamentally flawed; in the real world, assigning a certain action as categorically Good or Bad is practically impossible due to unintended consequences. In the fourth season, they are given a chance to prove their hypothesis. They design an experiment meant to demonstrate that humans in a simulated Good Place can show moral development. One of the experiment subjects is Eleanor's boyfriend, Chidi (William Jackson Harper), who has volunteered to have his memory erased to preserve the integrity of the experiment. Jameela Jamil, Manny Jacinto, and D'Arcy Carden also star as Eleanor and Michael's friends and collaborators in the experiment. Each of the episodes is listed as "Chapter (xx)" following the opening title card; the final episode is listed as "The Final Chapter".

Cast

Main

 Kristen Bell as Eleanor Shellstrop, a deceased, selfish saleswoman from Phoenix, Arizona. She pretends to be the architect of the Good Place after Michael becomes overwhelmed and has a panic attack.
 William Jackson Harper as Chidi Anagonye, a deceased professor of ethics and moral philosophy from Senegal. After having his memories of the afterlife erased, Chidi serves as one of the human participants in the team's experiment.
 Jameela Jamil as Tahani Al-Jamil, a deceased, wealthy English philanthropist who believes she belongs in the Good Place. She forms an unlikely friendship with Eleanor, who initially dislikes her positive attitude, condescending way of speaking, and tendency to name drop.
 D'Arcy Carden as Janet, a programmed guide and knowledge bank who acts as the Good Place's main source of information and can provide its residents with whatever they desire. Later, Janet gains a more humanlike disposition, and begins to act differently from the way she was designed. Carden also plays various versions of Janet:
 Bad Janet, a disrespectful version designed not to respond to residents properly. She pretended to be Good Janet after the real Good Janet was kidnapped until Jason saw through the deception. She is released by Michael and is given a manifesto about the experiment.
 Neutral Janet, an emotionless Janet who works in the neutral zone between the Good Place and the Bad Place.
 Disco Janet. According to Michael, she was "fun, but a lot".
 Manny Jacinto as Jason Mendoza, a deceased amateur DJ and drug dealer from Jacksonville, Florida who winds up in the Good Place by mistake. He is introduced as Jianyu Li, a Taiwanese monk who took a vow of silence. Later, Jason proves to be an immature and unintelligent, but kindhearted Jacksonville Jaguars and Blake Bortles fan. 
 Ted Danson as Michael, an architect who runs the Good Place neighborhood in which Eleanor, Chidi, Tahani, and Jason reside. Michael has a deep affinity for the mundane aspects of human life, like playing with paper clips or searching for one's car keys. "Michael" is a Hebrew name meaning "who is like God?"

Recurring
 Marc Evan Jackson as Shawn, Michael's wicked boss. Shawn gives Michael two chances to pull off the torture experiment, and later turns against him when he finds out about Michael's betrayal. 
 Maya Rudolph as the eternal Judge who rules on interdimensional matters between the Good Place and the Bad Place. 
 Kirby Howell-Baptiste as Simone Garnett, an Australian neuroscientist and, briefly, Chidi's girlfriend. She dies and becomes the experimental Good Place's second test subject, complicating the test and causing the erasure of Chidi's memories. When she arrives, she is in complete denial of her surroundings, believing them to be hallucinations of her dying brain.
 Tiya Sircar as Vicky, a Bad Place demon who is introduced as the "real Eleanor Shellstrop" in the first attempt of Michael's torture plan. Though Shawn subsequently encased her in a cocoon as a punishment, she was shown at the end of season 3 and beginning of season 4 to be wearing a body suit which made her identical in appearance to Michael. Shawn created the suit to enable the demons to torment the four humans upon the seemingly inevitable failure of the new experiment. She is later exploded into goo while posing as Michael during a ceremony to celebrate the skinsuits, but is brought back to redeem herself for a new experiment. Vicky later becomes in charge of the rehabilitation Bad Place.
 Maribeth Monroe as Mindy St. Claire, a deceased corporate lawyer and cocaine addict who just barely toed the line of earning enough Good Place points before her death and thus was awarded her own private Medium Place. When Derek was sent to her during season 3, she rebooted him repeatedly, which made him smarter, more sophisticated and refined.
 Jason Mantzoukas as Derek, a wacky artificial rebound boyfriend created by Janet who was later sent to Mindy St. Claire. Through subsequent and repeated reboots, he is shown to be evolved in his capacities, intelligence, and refinement.
 Luke Guldan as Chris, a muscular Bad Place demon who is sent by Shawn to thwart Michael's experiment by posing as Linda Johansen (Rachel Winfree), a sweet, but boring, old lady from Norway.
 Brandon Scott Jones as John Wheaton, the first test subject sent to the experimental Good Place. In life, he was a gossip columnist, and especially published trashy articles about Tahani.
 Benjamin Koldyke as Brent Norwalk, the fourth test subject sent to the experimental Good Place, a privileged and entitled chauvinist.
 Jama Williamson as Val, Shawn's secretary.
 Bambadjan Bamba as Bambadjan, an underling for the Bad Place.
 Josh Siegal as Glenn, an underling for the Bad Place, who later became a traitor after realizing how good humans are. He is exploded into goo by Bad Janet (who was posing as Good Janet).
 Brad Morris as Matt, a suicidal accountant who works in a neutral office between the Good Place and the Bad Place. He is assigned as the accountant for Eleanor and Michael's experiment.
 Joe Mande as the voice of Toddrick Hemple, a lava monster who refuses to wear a human suit.
 Paul Scheer as Chuck, a member of the Good Place committee.

Guest
 Timothy Olyphant as himself, dressed as his Justified character Raylan Givens, who is conjured up by Janet for the Judge.
 Lisa Kudrow as Hypatia / "Patty", one of the residents of the Good Place.
 Nick Offerman as himself, teaching Tahani woodworking.
 Mary Steenburgen as Michael's guitar teacher. Steenburgen is also the real-life wife of Ted Danson, who plays Michael.
 Pamela Hieronymi as herself, attending a philosophy class held by Chidi. Hieronymi was also a philosophical advisor to the show.
 Todd May as himself, attending a philosophy class held by Chidi. May was also a philosophical advisor to the show.
 Mitch Narito as Donkey Doug, Jason's dopey father.
 Eugene Cordero as Steven "Pillboi" Peleaz, Jason's best friend and partner in crime.
 Angela Trimbur as Madison, Eleanor's roommate. 
 Meryl Hathaway as Brittany, Eleanor's roommate.

Episodes

Specials
An hour-long retrospective, The Paley Center Salutes The Good Place, aired on September 19, 2019, featuring interviews with cast members and series creator Michael Schur; the special received 1.25 million viewers. A special featuring the six main cast members and hosted by Seth Meyers followed the 75 minute series finale on January 30, 2020; the special received 1.93 million viewers.

Reception
On Rotten Tomatoes, the fourth season has a rating of 100%, based on 25 reviews, with an average rating of 8.3/10. The site's critical consensus reads, "A wild philosophical ride to the very end, The Good Place brings it home with a forking good final season."

Accolades

At the 72nd Primetime Emmy Awards, the series received six nominations–Outstanding Comedy Series, Ted Danson for Outstanding Lead Actor in a Comedy Series, D'Arcy Carden for Outstanding Supporting Actress in a Comedy Series, William Jackson Harper for Outstanding Supporting Actor in a Comedy Series, Maya Rudolph for Outstanding Guest Actress in a Comedy Series, and Michael Schur for Outstanding Writing for a Comedy Series for the series finale "Whenever You're Ready".

"The Answer" won the 2020 Hugo Award for Best Dramatic Presentation, Short Form.

"Whenever You're Ready" won the 2021 Hugo Award for Best Dramatic Presentation, Short Form and the Ray Bradbury Nebula Award for Outstanding Drama Presentation.

Ratings

References

External links
 
 

2019 American television seasons
2020 American television seasons
The Good Place seasons